Atal is a rural locality (a selo) in Yaksatovsky Selsoviet, Privolzhsky District, Astrakhan Oblast, Russia. The population was 643 as of 2010. There are 36 streets.

Geography 
Atal is located on the Kizan River, 37 km southwest of Nachalovo (the district's administrative centre) by road. Nartovsky is the nearest rural locality.

References 

Rural localities in Privolzhsky District, Astrakhan Oblast